Timofey Skopin (born 5 April 1989) is a Russian speed skater. He competed in the men's 500 metres event at the 2010 Winter Olympics.

References

1989 births
Living people
Russian male speed skaters
Olympic speed skaters of Russia
Speed skaters at the 2010 Winter Olympics
Sportspeople from Kirov, Kirov Oblast